Emil Andersson (born 29 April 1993) is a Swedish male table tennis parasportist competing at singles (class 8) and team events (class 6-8).

Andersson participated at the 2012 Summer Paralympics in London, where he won a bronze medal at the men's singles class 8. Andersson and Linus Karlsson won a silver medal at the 2016 Summer Paralympics in Rio de Janeiro, playing against the Ukrainian team at the men's team class 6-8 finals.

References 

1993 births
Living people
Paralympic table tennis players of Sweden
Medalists at the 2012 Summer Paralympics
Medalists at the 2016 Summer Paralympics
Paralympic silver medalists for Sweden
Paralympic bronze medalists for Sweden
Paralympic medalists in table tennis
Table tennis players at the 2012 Summer Paralympics
Table tennis players at the 2016 Summer Paralympics
Table tennis players at the 2020 Summer Paralympics
21st-century Swedish people